Prostanthera mulliganensis, commonly known as Mount Mulligan prostanthera, is a species of flowering plant that is endemic to Mount Mulligan in Queensland. It is a small shrub with hairy branchlets, oblong to egg-shaped leaves and mauve flowers with purple to dark mauve markings.

Description

Taxonomy
Prostanthera mulliganensis was first formally described in 2015 by Barry Conn and Trevor Wilson in the journal Telopea, based on plant material collected on the summit of Mount Mulligan.

Distribution and habitat
Mount Mulligan prostanthera is only known from Mount Mulligan where it grows in soil derived from sandstone and on sheer cliff faces.

Conservation status
This mintbush is classified as "critically endangered" under the Queensland Government Nature Conservation Act 1992.

References

mulliganensis
Flora of Queensland
Lamiales of Australia
Plants described in 2015
Taxa named by Barry John Conn
Endemic flora of Queensland